The women's Keirin event at the 2020 Summer Olympics took place on 4 and 5 August 2021 at the Izu Velodrome. 29 cyclists from 18 nations competed.

Background
This will be the 3rd appearance of the event, which has been held at every Summer Olympics since its introduction in 2012.

The reigning Olympic champion is Elis Ligtlee of the Netherlands. The reigning (2020) World Champion is Emma Hinze of Germany.

Russia, Germany, China, Great Britain, Australia, and the Netherlands are traditionally strong track cycling nations.

Qualification

A National Olympic Committee (NOC) could enter up to 2 qualified cyclists in the women's Keirin. Quota places are allocated to the NOC, which selects the cyclists. Qualification is entirely through the 2018–20 UCI nation rankings. The eight nations that qualify for the team sprint event may enter two cyclists each in the Keirin (as well as the individual sprint). The nations that qualify a cyclist through the individual sprint rankings may also enter that cyclist in the Keirin. Finally, seven places are allocated through the Keirin rankings. Because qualification was complete by the end of the 2020 UCI Track Cycling World Championships on 1 March 2020 (the last event that contributed to the 2018–20 rankings), qualification was unaffected by the COVID-19 pandemic.

Competition format
Keirin races involve up to seven cyclists each, though the 2020 format has no races with more than six.

The cyclists follow a pace motorcycle for three laps (750 m) before the motorcycle pulls away and the cyclists race for another three laps.

These distances are changed from the 2016 Games, shortening the paced section from 5½ laps and lengthening the unpaced sprint from 2½ laps. The motorcycle starts at 30 km/h and increases speed to 50 km/h before it pulls away.

The tournament consists of four main rounds, up from three in 2016, and a repechage:

 First round: Four heats of six cyclists and one of five, with the top two in each heat (10 total) advancing to the second round; all others (19 cyclists) go to the repechage.
 Repechage: Three heats of five cyclists and one of four, with the top two in each heat (8 total) rejoining the first-round winners in the second round; the remaining 11 cyclists are eliminated.
 Second round: Three heats of six cyclists each. The top four cyclists in each heat (12 total) advance to the semifinals; the remaining six cyclists are eliminated.
 Semifinals: Two heats of six cyclists each; the top three in each semifinal (six total) advance to Final A and medal contention; the bottom three cyclists from each semifinal go to Final B.
 Finals: Two finals. Final A consists of the top six cyclists, awarding medals and 4th through 6th place. Final B ranks the next six cyclists from 7th to 12th place.

Schedule
All times are Japan Standard Time (UTC+9)

Results

First round

Heat 1

Heat 2

Heat 3

Heat 4

Heat 5

Repechages

Heat 1

Heat 2

Heat 3

Heat 4

Quarterfinals

Heat 1

Heat 2

Heat 3

Semifinals

Heat 1

Heat 2

Finals

Final B

Final A

See also
Keirin
Cycling at the 2020 Summer Olympics
Cycling at the 2020 Summer Olympics – Men's keirin
Cycling at the 2020 Summer Olympics – Women's BMX racing

References

Women's Keirin
Cycling at the Summer Olympics – Women's keirin
Women's events at the 2020 Summer Olympics